Alain Bonnafous (born 21 June 1969) is a French former professional footballer who played as a centre-back. He started his career with Montpellier HSC and made 16 appearances in Ligue 1 for the club. Between 1991 and 1992, he spent time on loan with Olympique Alès before moving to Chamois Niortais on a permanent transfer in August 1992. Bonnafous played 108 league matches in three seasons with the team before joining CS Louhans-Cuiseaux in the summer of 1995. After two seasons with Louhans-Cuiseaux, he moved to Switzerland to play for SC Kriens, where he ended his career.

References
  
 
 
 

1969 births
Living people
Association football central defenders
French footballers
Montpellier HSC players
Olympique Alès players
Chamois Niortais F.C. players
Louhans-Cuiseaux FC players
SC Kriens players
Ligue 1 players
Ligue 2 players